"Bible Black" is a song by heavy metal band Heaven & Hell from their 2009 album, The Devil You Know. It was released on March 20, 2009, on WAXQ.

Premise
According to singer Ronnie James Dio, the song is about a man who is addicted to the Bible Black, a darkly twisted version of the Holy Bible, which ultimately corrupts and destroys him.

Music video
A music video for the song was made and premiered on VH1 Classic as the first video of Metal Mania. It came on right after the season 2 finale of That Metal Show, which Ronnie James Dio and Geezer Butler of Heaven & Hell were guests on. The video is in animation and features the band via shadows. The premise of the video is an angel in Heaven picks up a black book (a'la the song "Bible Black"). When he opens it, it sends him down to Hell.

Track list
 "Bible Black" (6:29)
 "Neon Knights" (live from Radio City Music Hall) (4:00)

References

2009 singles
Heaven & Hell (band) songs
Songs written by Tony Iommi
Songs written by Geezer Butler
Songs written by Ronnie James Dio
2009 songs
Rhino Entertainment singles
Doom metal songs